Joseph Rademacher (December 3, 1840 – June 12, 1900) was an American prelate of the Roman Catholic Church. He served as bishop of the Diocese of Nashville in Tennessee from 1883 to 1893 and as bishop of the Diocese of Fort Wayne in Indiana  from 1893 until his death in 1900.

Biography

Early life 
Joseph Rademacher was born on December 3, 1840, in Westphalia, Michigan, to Bernard and Theresia (née Platte) Rademacher, both German immigrants. In 1855, he began his classical and philosophical studies under the Benedictines at St. Vincent's College in Latrobe, Pennsylvania. He completed his theological studies at St. Michael's Seminary in Pittsburgh.

Priesthood 
Rademacher was ordained to the priesthood for the Diocese of Fort Wayne by Bishop John Luers on August 2, 1863. He then served as the first resident pastor in Attica, Indiana, also attending to the nearby missions. In 1870, he was transferred to a parish in Columbia City, Indiana. In 1872, Rademacher was appointed chancellor of the diocese and pastor of St. Mary's Parish in Fort Wayne, Indiana. He served as pastor of St. Mary of the Immaculate Conception Parish in Lafayette, Indiana, from 1880 to 1883.

Bishop of Nashville 
On April 3, 1883, Rademacher was appointed as the fourth bishop of the Diocese of Nashville by Pope Leo XIII. He received his episcopal consecration on June 24, 1883, from Archbishop Patrick Feehan, with Bishops Joseph Dwenger and John Watterson serving as co-consecrators.

Bishop of Fort Wayne 
Rademacher was named the third bishop of the Diocese of Fort Wayne by Leo XIII on July 15, 1893. Unlike his predecessor, Rademacher was known as a mild and approachable leader.

Death and legacy 
Rademacher was disabled by a stroke in early 1899, and was admitted to St. Joseph Hospital in Fort Wayne, then to St. Elizabeth Hospital in Chicago. Joseph Rademacher died at St. Elizabeth's on June 12, 1900, at age 59.

References

External links
 

1840 births
1900 deaths
People from Clinton County, Michigan
19th-century Roman Catholic bishops in the United States
Saint Vincent College alumni
Roman Catholic bishops of Fort Wayne
Roman Catholic bishops of Nashville
Catholics from Michigan